Xu Xianping (born October 1954) is a retired Chinese politician. He served as deputy director of National Development and Reform Commission between May 2009 and February 2015, and vice-governor of Hunan from January 2003 to May 2009.

He was a delegate to the 9th, 10th and 11th National People's Congress. He was also a member of the 12th National Committee of the Chinese People's Political Consultative Conference.

Biography
Xu was born in Longhui County, Hunan in October 1954. In March 1973, during the Down to the Countryside Movement, he became a sent-down youth in Dachong Commune of Qianyang County. 

Beginning in September 1984 he entered the Communist Youth League of China in Hunan, he served in several posts there, including secretary, deputy party chief and party group members.

In September 1994 he was promoted to become vice-mayor of Changsha, capital of Hunan, and then executive vice-mayor in December 1997.

In January 2003 he was promoted again to become vice-governor of Hunan, and held that office until May 2009. Then he was transferred to Beijing and appointed deputy director of National Development and Reform Commission, he served in the post until he retirement in February 2015.

In August 2016, he was hired as a consultant of the State Council of China.

References

1954 births
People from Shaoyang
Living people
People's Republic of China politicians from Hunan
Chinese Communist Party politicians from Hunan
Members of the 12th Chinese People's Political Consultative Conference